Wallaceodendron is a  monotypic genus of flowering plants in the family Fabaceae. It belongs to the mimosoid clade of the subfamily Caesalpinioideae. The sole species is Wallaceodendron celebicum.

References

Mimosoids
Monotypic Fabaceae genera
Taxa named by Sijfert Hendrik Koorders